The Slaughter of the Knezes was the organized assassinations and assaults of  noble Serbs in the Sanjak of Smederevo in January 1804 by the rebellious Dahije. Fearing that the Sultan would make use of the Serbs to oust them, they decided to execute leading Serbs throughout the Sanjak. A total of 72 noble Serbs were assassinated, and their heads were put on public display. Notable victims were Aleksa Nenadović and Ilija Birčanin. The event triggered the Serbian revolution, aimed at putting an end to the centuries of occupation.

Background
In 1788, Koča's frontier rebellion saw most of Šumadija occupied by the Serbian Free Corps, a volunteer militia loyal to the Austrians. Belgrade was besieged by Austrian forces in late 1789, occupied until 1791 when it was handed back to the Caliphate after concluding peace. In 1793 and 1796 Sultan Selim III proclaimed firmans (decrees) which gave more rights to Serbs. Among other things, taxes were to be collected by the obor-knez; freedom of trade and religion were granted and there was peace. Each village had a knez and 10 villages had an obor-knez. Selim III also decreed that some unpopular Janissaries were to leave the Sanjak of Smederevo (also known as the "Belgrade Pashaluk") as he saw them as a threat to the central authority of Hadži Mustafa Pasha, the governor. Many of those Janissaries were employed by or found refuge with Osman Pazvantoğlu, a renegade opponent of Selim III in the Sanjak of Vidin. Fearing the dissolution of the Janissary command in the Sanjak of Smederevo, Osman Pazvantoğlu launched a series of raids against Serbians without the permission of Selim III, causing much volatility and fear in the region. Pazvantoğlu was defeated in 1793 by a Serbian contingent at the Battle of Kolari. 

In the summer of 1797, the sultan appointed Mustafa Pasha on position of beglerbeg of Rumelia Eyalet and he left Serbia for Plovdiv to fight against Pazvantoğlu and his rebels. During the absence of Mustafa Pasha, the forces of Pazvantoğlu captured Požarevac and besieged the Belgrade fortress. Mustafa Pasha planned to raise taxes in order to pay for the operations against the Janissary rebels, however, he was persuaded by the Serbian knezes to rely on them on mustering a force of the local population. The Serbians were able to collect 10,000 fighters. At the end of November 1797, obor-knezes Aleksa Nenadović, Ilija Birčanin and Nikola Grbović from Valjevo brought their forces to Belgrade and forced the besieging Janissary forces to retreat to Smederevo. By 1799 the Janissary corps had returned, as they were pardoned by the Sultan's decree, and they immediately suspended the Serbian autonomy and drastically increased taxes, enforcing martial law in Serbia. On 15 December 1801 Mustafa Pasha was assassinated by Kuchuk Alija, one of four Dahije (the renegade Jannissary leaders in the Sanjak of Smederevo). The Dahije henceforth ruled the Sanjak independently of, and in defiance to the sultan.
 
The tyranny endured by the Serbs caused them to send a petition to the Sultan, which the Dahije learnt of. According to Leopold von Ranke, the Dahije started to fear that the Sultan would make use of the Serbs to oust them; to forestall this they decided to execute leading Serbs throughout the sanjak. In fact, the Dahije learnt of a conspiracy between the Serbians and Mustafa Pasha's associates (who wanted revenge) to rise against the Dahije, forged in 1803. A letter to an Austrian officer inviting for conflict, most likely written by Hadži-Ruvim, was intercepted.

History
 
The Dahije sent secret orders to their muteselims to kill each of their knez on the given day. It seems that Mehmed-aga Fočić was tasked with overseeing the operation. The victims were obor-knezes, knezes, buljubašas and other chosen people. Most of the knezes were killed on 23 January, while Hadži-Ruvim was killed on 29 January. By 25 January, the Dahije decided that noble Serbs were to be beaten, so that what was left would become real "rayah, to serve well". Other warlords then began to attack chosen nobles in their districts. Karađorđe survived attempts. According to contemporary accounts, heads were put on public display at the Valjevo town square to serve as an example to those who might plot against the rule of the Dahije. By 4 February, 72 decapitated heads were brought to Belgrade.

List of victims
  
Stevan Andrejević Palalija, knez of Begaljica in the Grocka nahiya. Lured and killed.
Marko Čarapić, knez of Beli Potok in the Grocka nahiya. Killed during a wedding.
Janko Gagić, kmet and buljubaša, from Boleč in the Grocka nahiya. Killed after giving himself up to save his kidnapped son.
Stanoje Mihailović, knez of Zeoke in the Belgrade nahiya. Killed in his home, on 24–25 January.
Aleksa Nenadović, knez of Tamnava in the Valjevo nahiya. Killed on 23 January.
Ilija Birčanin, knez of Podgor in the Valjevo nahiya. Killed on 23 January.
Hadži-Ruvim, archimandrite of Bogovađa in the Valjevo nahiya. Tortured to death at the hands of Kučuk-Alija on 28 January.
Three priests from the Šabac nahiya, Živko, Maksim, and an unnamed protosynkellos of the Bishop of Šabac, were killed in Šabac in the later phase. The former two were pierced in the legs with knives and taken to the fortress and killed there. The latter was cut into pieces in the town center (čaršija).
Radosav Kalabić, knez of Jadar in the Zvornik nahiya, and his friend priest Vilip.
Killed in the monastery.
Gavrilo Buđevac, buljubaša, from the Rudnik nahiya.
Mata, buljubaša, from Lipovac in the Kragujevac nahiya. Cut down by the Kragujevac mutesellim or Kučuk-Husejin.
Jovica from Knić in the Kragujevac nahiya. Cut down by the Kragujevac mutesellim.
Nikola Ćirjanić from Orašje in the Kragujevac nahiya. Beaten to death by the Kragujevac mutesellim.

Teofan, knez of Orašje in the Smederevo nahija.
Petar, knez of Resava in the Jagodina nahija.
Jovan, knez
Mata, buljubaša, from Lipovac in the Kragujevac nahija.
Gavrilo Buđevac, buljubaša
Nikola Grbović, obor-knez of Mratišića
knez Tavnavski of Ljutica
knez Mačvanski of Bogatić
knez Pocerski of Metković
Hadži-Melentije Stevanović

See also

Uprising against the Dahije

References

Sources

 

 

Conflicts in 1804
First Serbian Uprising
Massacres in Serbia
Massacres of Serbs
Persecution of Serbs
Assassinated Serbian people
Ottoman Serbia
Valjevo
1804 in Serbia
1804 in the Ottoman Empire
Massacres in the Ottoman Empire
Trophy heads
Assassinations in the Ottoman Empire
January 1804 events
Murder in the Ottoman Empire
1804 murders in the Ottoman Empire